Great Food Hall  is a supermarket founded in 2000 in Hong Kong. It is owned by AS Watson, a wholly owned subsidiary of Hutchison Whampoa Limited. It has a branch in Pacific Place, Admiralty, which was opened in 2000 based on the re-decoration of Park'n Shop, Great's sister company. Its main customers are middle-class families. There is also a Triple O's burger restaurant, a café with food, and an ice cream stand inside the store.

See Also
Park'n Shop
Taste (supermarket)
Gourmet (supermarket)

References

External links
Great

Admiralty, Hong Kong
AS Watson
Department stores of Hong Kong
Retail companies established in 2000
Supermarkets of Hong Kong